Springfield is a Statutory Town which is also the county seat and most populous town in Baca County, Colorado, United States. The population was 1,451 at the 2010 census.

History
The town was named after Springfield, Missouri.

Frank and Jim Tipton settled in Las Animas, Colorado in 1886.  In 1888 or 1889, Jim and Frank secured the title to 80 acres which was the original townsite.  They did this using a "soldiers script" and named the town after Springfield, Mo, since this is where the Tipton brothers had come from.

Geography and climate
Springfield is located in north-central Baca County at  (37.406629, -102.617243).  It is located approximately 30 miles north of the Oklahoma state line.

U.S. Routes 287 and 385 pass through the center of the town, leading north  to Lamar, Colorado, and south  to Boise City, Oklahoma. U.S. Route 160 passes just to the south of the town, leading west  to Trinidad, Colorado, and east  to Johnson City, Kansas.

Springfield Municipal Airport (FAA ID: 8V7) is four miles north.

Springfield has a cool semi-arid climate (Köppen BSk) with hot summers featuring mild mornings and occasional heavy thunderstorm rains, and highly variable winters that range from very warm and windy to frigid and relatively still.

Demographics

As of the census of 2010, there were 1,451 people, 715 households, and 409 families residing in the town. The racial makeup of the town was 94.88% White, 1.15% Native American, 0.19% Asian, 2.56% from other races, and 1.22% from two or more races. Hispanic or Latino of any race were 5.83% of the population.

There were 715 households, out of which 23.1% had children under the age of 18 living with them, 44.8% were married couples living together, 9.9% had a female householder with no husband present, and 42.7% were non-families. 38.6% of all households were made up of individuals, and 20.6% had someone living alone who was 65 years of age or older. The average household size was 2.10 and the average family size was 2.80.

In the town, the population was spread out, with 21.4% under the age of 18, 6.7% from 18 to 24, 22.1% from 25 to 44, 23.7% from 45 to 64, and 26.2% who were 65 years of age or older. The median age was 45 years. For every 100 females, there were 88.9 males. For every 100 females age 18 and over, there were 86.3 males.

The median income for a household in the town was $28,099, and the median income for a family was $34,107. Males had a median income of $25,385 versus $16,339 for females. The per capita income for the town was $13,890. About 14.4% of families and 16.8% of the population were below the poverty line, including 18.6% of those under age 18 and 17.8% of those age 65 or over.

Government
The Board of Trustees as of December 2020 consists of Tyler K Gibson (Mayor), Ervin Maltbie (Mayor Pro-Tem), and Trustees Ted Locke, Jim Howard, Mike Cooper, Dan McVey, and Christy Brady.  Town Clerk is Tammy Newman; Town Manager/Treasurer is Merna McGinnis.

Education
The superintendent, and elementary principal, is Richard Hargrove, and the high school principal is Kyle Lasley. The town has one library.

Notable people
Notable individuals who were born in or have lived in Springfield include:
 Alfred A. Arraj (1906-1992), U.S. federal judge

See also

Outline of Colorado
Index of Colorado-related articles
State of Colorado
Colorado cities and towns
Colorado municipalities
Colorado counties
Baca County, Colorado
Springfield Schoolhouse

References

External links

Town of Springfield official website
Map of Springfield, CDOT
Springfield School District, RE-4

Towns in Baca County, Colorado
Towns in Colorado
County seats in Colorado